The Police (Scotland) Act 1956 was an Act of the Parliament of the United Kingdom.

Except for s.37, the whole Act was repealed by the Police (Scotland) Act 1967.

1956 in Scotland
United Kingdom Acts of Parliament 1956
Acts of the Parliament of the United Kingdom concerning Scotland
Law enforcement in Scotland
Police legislation in the United Kingdom